Nurettin Demirtaş (born 1972) was a former Kurdish politician of the Democratic Society Party (DTP) in Turkey and a member of the Kurdistan Workers' Party (PKK).

Early life and education 
He grew up and attended secondary school in Diyarbakır. He then studied business at university in Muğla, where he was arrested in 1993 for his political activities. He spent the following 12 years in prison. After his release he became the founding president of an association for the development of civil society. On 28 May 2006 he was arrested after having attended a funeral of members of the PKK and spent 4 months in prison.

Political career 
He was elected the vice-president in February 2007 and president of the DTP on 9 December 2007, at the party's second general assembly. As a politician he was a peace activist and in September 2007, he and Selma Irmak were prosecuted for having mistreated the Turkish nation for having distributed leaflets criticizing  the Turkish military on International World Peace Day. The investigation over a violating the Article 301 of the Turkish penal code was dismissed only in May 2008.  

On 17 December 2007 he was arrested on his return from a European tour and imprisoned on charges of forging a document to evade military conscription. He was released 28 April 2008 by a military court and enlisted in the army the following day. Turkish men are required to serve in the army for up to 15 months after the age of 20 unless they have health problems that prevent them from fulfilling military duty. In May 2008 he resigned from the presidency of the DTP.  On 9 November 2009 he was sentenced to 6 years and 3 months for having attended a funeral of PKK militants, a sentence he appealed.

Later Demirtaş left Turkey and joined the PKK. Anadolu agency reported its armed forces had wounded Nurettin in 2015.

Selahattin Demirtaş is his brother and former chairman of HDP.

References

1972 births
Turkish Kurdish politicians
Living people
Democratic Regions Party politicians
Democratic Society Party politicians
Turkish prisoners and detainees
Kurdish politicians
Politicians arrested in Turkey

Members of the Kurdistan Workers' Party
People from Elazığ